The Takaputahi River is a river of the Gisborne Region of New Zealand's North Island. It has its origins in numerous streams which rise in rough hill country close to the eastern end of the Bay of Plenty, the longest of which is the Rawea Stream. The Takaputahi flows generally east, away from the Bay of Plenty coast, before meeting the Motu River. Much of the river's length is within the Raukumara Forest Park.

See also
List of rivers of New Zealand

References

Rivers of the Gisborne District
Rivers of New Zealand